Brave Raj (1984–2006) was an American Thoroughbred racehorse who raced only one year and earned 1986 American Champion Two-Year-Old Filly honors and won the Breeders' Cup Juvenile Fillies.

A descendant of Nearco through both her sire Rajab and her dam, Bravest Yet, Brave Raj was bred in Florida and purchased by trainer Ben Perkins, Sr. for $24,000 at the Ocala Breeders' Sales Company's February sale of 2-year-olds. After racing once, Brave Raj was acquired by California oil heiress Dolly Green. She entrusted her conditioning to trainer Mel Stute.

Brave Raj's 1986 earnings set a world record for fillies in her age group. A knee injury ended her racing career and she was retired to broodmare duty at Patchen Wilkes Farm in Lexington, Kentucky where she produced ten winners, including two who won stakes races. She died at Patchen Wilkes Farm on January 28, 2006, one week after losing a foal.

Pedigree

References

External links
Brave Raj's pedigree and partial racing stats
January 31, 2006 obituary for Brave Raj at Thoroughbred Times

Racehorses bred in Florida
Racehorses trained in the United States
Breeders' Cup Juvenile Fillies winners
Eclipse Award winners
1984 racehorse births
2006 racehorse deaths
Thoroughbred family 7